Dancin' With Them That Brung Me is the second solo album by Stacey Earle, following her 1998 release Simple Gearle, both albums released independently through Gearle Records.

Reception
Michael Cusanelli of AllMusic writes "Dancin' With Them That Brung Me is one of those independent gems that the listener must find. It will not hold a premiere position in the record store or on the charts." Ellen Rawson of FemMusic states that "Earle’s first album, Simple Gearle, received adulation and earned her fans. Dancin’ with Them That Brung Me doesn’t show a single sign of a sophomore slump." Alex Steininger of InMusicWeTrust writes, "Toe-tappin', emotional country with plenty of feeling and love. I'll give it an A+." Steven Stone of EnjoyTheMusic says, "If Stacey Earle were a painter her work would look like Grandma Moses. It is primitive and graphic with a familiar folksy edge."

Track listing

Musicians
Stacey Earle: Perty songs, vocals, acoustic guitars
The Jewels are Mark Stuart, Kyle Mims & Michael Webb
Mark Stuart: Acoustic guitars, backing vocals, mandolin
Kyle Mims: Drums, percussion gadgets
Michael Webb: Accordion, mandolin, organ, bass, vocals
Sheryl Crow: Background vocals, harmonium, piano on track 7
Mike Bub: Bass on tracks 1, 5 & 6
Byron House: Bass on tracks 2, 4, 9 & 12
Mike Daly: Lap steel on track 9

Production
Produced by: Stacey Earle, Mark Stuart
Co-Produced by: Michael Webb
Engineered by: Michael Webb, Mike Hopkins, Kevin Brownstein, Brian Scheuble
Mixed by: Michael Webb, Stacey Earle, Mark Stuart
Mastered by: Randy Kling (Disc Mastering)
Pre-production by: Patrick Earle (Duck Tape)

All track information and credits were taken from the CD liner notes.

References

2000 albums